Hayden Silas Anhedönia (born March 24, 1998), known professionally as Ethel Cain, is an American singer-songwriter born in Tallahassee, Florida and living in Pittsburgh, Pennsylvania.

In mid 2017, Cain began experimenting with writing, recording, and producing her own ethereal style, inspired by Christian music and Gregorian chants. After releasing various mixtapes and EPs on streaming platforms under the moniker White Silas, as well as sites like SoundCloud and Tumblr, she adopted a more alternative sound and began using the Ethel Cain moniker in mid-2019. Cain's lyrics focus on nostalgic and Southern Gothic themes, such as poverty, substance abuse, domestic violence, death, and transgenerational trauma. Her music has been associated with the ambient, alternative rock, and dream pop genres.

In 2022, Cain released her debut studio album, Preacher's Daughter, to widespread acclaim from music critics—many of whom called it one of the best albums of the year.

Early life
Cain was raised in Perry, Florida, the eldest of four children in a Southern Baptist family. Her father was a deacon and she was involved in the church choir from a young age. At age eight, Cain began studying classical piano, and her early musical influences included Karen Carpenter, the Steve Miller Band, and a variety of Christian music.

She came out as gay to her family at the age of 12, and left the church at the age of 16. On her 20th birthday, she publicly came out as a trans woman. Reflecting on this, Cain recalled: "It was made clear to everyone that I was not like other people. Whenever I started to develop, I started to come into my own as a trans woman. We were a house divided—it was me versus my whole town."

Cain finds inspiration from gospel music, country music, classic rock and alternative music.

Career

2017–2019: Career beginnings
In 2017, while considering enrolling in the Florida State University film school, Cain began experimenting with creating reverb-heavy choral inspired music on GarageBand. From 2017 to 2018, she released her works to a small following of friends and followers on Twitter and Instagram, under the names White Silas and Atlas. In 2019, following the release of her debut single as Ethel Cain, titled 'Bruises', she connected with artist Nicole Dollanganger through social media, opening for Dollanganger on the artist's 'Heart Shaped Bed' tour in Chicago.

In September 2019, she released a small collection of songs titled Carpet Bed, her first extended play under the Cain moniker.

In December 2019, after the release of her Golden Age EP, she was backed by artist Wicca Phase Springs Eternal, who praised Cain for her "mature songwriting and understanding of melody".

2020–2021: Inbred

In January 2020, after recommendation from Wicca Phase Springs Eternal, Cain was discovered by rapper Lil Aaron. While headlining a show with Edith Underground, Girlfiend, and Lil Bo Weep in Los Angeles, Cain was invited by Aaron to meet with the publishing company Prescription Songs and signed with them soon after. In August 2020, Cain moved from Florida into a refurbished church outside of Richmond, Indiana, where she would finish recording her first EP with Prescription Songs titled Inbred. In February 2021, Cain released her first single under the new publishing contract, titled "Michelle Pfeiffer" featuring Lil Aaron. The song was premiered on Paper and featured on Pitchfork, Billboard, Nylon, and The Fader. A second single, "Crush", followed on March 18, and a third, "Unpunishable", premiered on Apple Music Radio 1 with Zane Lowe on April 15, 2021. Inbred was released on April 23, 2021. The EP explores Americana, ambient-folk and slowcore.

2022–present: Preacher's Daughter

On March 17, 2022, Cain released the single "Gibson Girl", subsequently announcing her debut album Preacher's Daughter, released May 12, 2022. Cain went on to release singles "Strangers" on April 7, and "American Teenager" on April 21, the latter receiving a music video on July 21. The album was released via her own Daughters of Cain label and features thirteen songs.

Personal life
Reflecting on her religious upbringing in a 2021 interview, Cain commented that she still considers herself a Southern Baptist: "Whether I like it or not, God always has and always will be a huge part of my life. Whether He's being used as a comforting figure or a threat, I've always been surrounded by it. It's not really something you can walk away from. And I'd rather just sit with it than be like, 'Fuck the church!'"

She elaborated in a 2022 Tumblr post that she does not consider herself a Christian, nor as someone who cares about religion. However, she "still abides by the values [she] was raised on."

Cain is bisexual and autistic.

Discography

Studio albums

Extended plays

Singles

Music videos

Concert tours 

 The Freezer Bride Tour (2022)
 Blood Stained Blonde Tour (2023)

References

External links
 
 
 
 

1998 births
21st-century American women singers
21st-century American singers
American women singer-songwriters
Living people
People from Perry, Florida
Transgender singers
Transgender women musicians
Singer-songwriters from Florida
LGBT Baptists
American LGBT singers
LGBT people from Florida
Bisexual musicians
Bisexual women
People on the autism spectrum